Rear Admiral John Mellen Brady Clitz (1 December 1821 – 9 October 1897) was an officer in the United States Navy. During his long naval career, he fought in both the Mexican War and the American Civil War and rose to command of the Asiatic Squadron.

Naval career
Clitz was born in Sackets Harbor, New York, on 1 December 1821. He was appointed as a midshipman on 12 April 1837, and soon was attached to the sloop-of-war  in the West Indies Squadron, serving aboard her from 1838 to 1842. He then studied at the Philadelphia Naval School in Philadelphia, Pennsylvania, in 1843 and, having completed his training as a midshipman, was promoted to passed midshipman on 29 June 1843.

Clitz's next assignment was to the new sloop-of-war  in the Mediterranean Squadron from 1844 to 1845, after which he served aboard the sloop-of-war  in the Home Squadron from 1845 to 1846.

After the outbreak of the Mexican War, Clitz transferred to the bomb brig  in 1847, a ship purchased in 1846 and commissioned in 1847 for service in that conflict as part of the Home Squadron. Aboard Hecla, Clitz arrived in Mexican waters at Isla de Sacrificios off Veracruz on the morning of 29 March 1847 and participated in the final day of the siege of the city before it ended with the surrender of the Castle of San Juan de Ulúa to American forces that evening. Hecla then began patrols in the Gulf of Mexico, during which she took part in the American amphibious seizure of Tuxpan in April 1847. Later in 1847, Clitz transferred to the screw steamer  – also in the Home Squadron but immobilized in Mexican waters due to mechanical problems – until 1848.

After the Mexican War, Clitz served aboard the sailing frigate  in the Mediterranean Squadron from 1849 to 1851, being promoted to master while aboard her on 16 August 1850. Promoted to lieutenant on 6 April 1851, he had duty with the United States Coast Survey from 1851 to 1852, then was aboard the steam paddle frigate  in the East India Squadron from 1852 to 1855. After special duty in Washington, D.C., in 1856, he was aboard the sloop-of-war  in the Pacific Squadron from 1858 to 1859 and then aboard the steam sloop-of-war  in 1861.

The American Civil War broke out in April 1861, and Clitz served extensively in operations related to the Union blockade of the Confederate States of America. Promoted to commander on 16 July 1862, he was the commanding officer of the steam gunboat  in the North Atlantic Blockading Squadron in 1863 and later that year of the steam sloop-of-war  in the East Gulf Blockading Squadron. He commanded the new sidewheel gunboat  in the North Atlantic Blockading Squadron from 1864 to 1865 and led her in both the First Battle of Fort Fisher in December 1864 and the Second Battle of Fort Fisher in January 1865, both of them attacks against Fort Fisher, one of the fortifications guarding Wilmington, North Carolina. In a dispatch of 28 January 1865, Rear Admiral David Dixon Porter commended him for his actions at Fort Fisher and recommended him for promotion.

After the Civil War, Clitz reported for duty in 1866 at the Boston Navy Yard in Charlestown, Massachusetts, and was promoted to captain on 25 July 1866. He commanded the steam sloop-of-war  in the South Atlantic Squadron from 1868 to 1869 before performing ordnance duty at the New York Navy Yard in Brooklyn, New York, in 1870. He then commanded the steam frigate  in the Pacific Squadron from 1870 to 1872.

Promoted to commodore on 28 December 1872, Clitz commanded Naval Station Port Royal in Port Royal, South Carolina, from 1876 to 1877 and was a lighthouse inspector from 1878 to 1880.

Promoted to rear admiral on 13 March 1880, Clitz was commander-in-chief of the Asiatic Squadron from 11 September 1880 to 21 April 1883.

Scheduled to retire from the Navy upon reaching the mandatory retirement age of 62 on 1 December 1883, Clitz applied to retire earlier, and did so on 16 October 1883.

Personal life
Clitz married the former Mary L. Bohrer (1823–1894) on 21 November 1843. They had three children.

Retirement and death
In retirement, Clitz resided in Brooklyn, New York. He died at St. Elizabeths Asylum in Washington, D.C., on 9 October 1897. Clitz was buried at Arlington National Cemetery, Arlington, Virginia.

Notes

References
 Naval History and Heritage Command: Officers of the Continental and U.S. Navy and Marine Corps, 1775–1900.
 Dictionary of American Naval Fighting Ships: Hecla I
 "Death List of a Day: John M. B. Clitz." The New York Times, 10 October 1897.
 Hamersly, Lewis Randolph. The Records of Living Officers of the U.S. Navy and Marine Corps, Fifth Edition. Philadelphia: L. R. Hamersly & Co., 1894.
 Tolley, Kemp. Yangtze Patrol: The U.S. Navy in China. Annapolis, Maryland: Naval Institute Press, 1971. .

External links
 "Admiral Clitz Robbed," The New York Times, 28 April 1884 – newspaper report of the 27 April 1884 pickpocketing of John M. B. Clitz.
 John Mellen Brady Clitz at ArlingtonCemetery.net, an unofficial website

1821 births
1897 deaths
People from Sackets Harbor, New York
United States Navy rear admirals (upper half)
United States Navy personnel of the Mexican–American War
Union Navy officers
People of New York (state) in the American Civil War
Burials at Arlington National Cemetery